George Willis Hudlin (May 23, 1906 – August 5, 2002) was born in Wagoner, Oklahoma, and was a Major League Baseball pitcher for, most notably, the Cleveland Indians from 1926 to 1940. Hudlin did not pitch more than 10 games with any other team, although he played with three others.

In 1940, Hudlin became one of the few players to compete on four different major league teams in the same year (Cleveland Indians, Washington Senators, New York Giants, and the St. Louis Browns).

Hudlin's career statistics include a 158–156 record, with a 4.41 ERA. He had 677 strikeouts in 2613 career innings pitched.

Hudlin was the pitcher who gave up Babe Ruth's 500th home run.

Hudlin was a good hitting pitcher in his career, recording a .201 batting average (180-for-894) with 76 runs, 5 home runs, 69 RBI and 52 bases on balls.

Hudlin's pitch selection included a well-known sinker, a fastball, curveball and a changeup. He occasionally threw sidearm or with an underhand "dip of the wrist", though he threw overhand most often.

After Hudlin finished playing in the majors, he was a manager for the minor league Little Rock Travelers and pitching coach for the Detroit Tigers under skippers Jack Tighe, Bill Norman and Jimmy Dykes (1957–59).

Hudlin later became a scout for the New York Yankees, for whom he even scouted his own son, James, who was given a contract to play professionally, but was drafted to serve in the Vietnam War.

Willis Hudlin was a member of the Army Air Forces during World War II as a flight instructor. He died in Little Rock, Arkansas, at the age of 96, and was interred in Hazelhurst Cemetery, Hazelhursrt, Copiah County, Mississippi.

References

External links

1906 births
2002 deaths
Baseball players from Oklahoma
Cleveland Indians players
Detroit Tigers coaches
Detroit Tigers scouts
Jackson Senators players
Little Rock Travelers players
Major League Baseball pitchers
Major League Baseball pitching coaches
Minor league baseball managers
New York Giants (NL) players
New York Yankees scouts
People from Wagoner, Oklahoma
St. Louis Browns players
Sportspeople from Little Rock, Arkansas
Washington Senators (1901–1960) players